Hypotrichosis–acro-osteolysis–onychogryphosis–palmoplantar keratoderma–periodontitis syndrome (also known as "HOPP syndrome") is a cutaneous condition characterized by a prominent palmoplantar keratoderma.

See also 
 Hereditary sclerosing poikiloderma
 List of cutaneous conditions

References

External links 

Genodermatoses
Syndromes